Beth A. Simmons (born 1958) is an American academic and notable international relations scholar. She is the Andrea Mitchell University Professor in Law, Political Science and Business Ethics at the University of Pennsylvania Law School. She is a former Director of the Weatherhead Center for International Affairs at Harvard University and Clarence Dillon Professor of International Affairs at the Department of Government. Her research interests include international relations, political economy, international law, and international human rights law compliance.

Early life 
Simmons was born in 1958 in the San Francisco Bay Area in California and attended Monta Vista High School in Cupertino, California where she excelled in speech, debate, and music. She earned a BA in political science and philosophy summa cum laude from the University of Redlands, an MA in international relations from the University of Chicago, and an MA and PhD in government from Harvard, where she was a student of international relations theorist Robert Keohane.

Career 
Simmons taught as an assistant professor at Duke University (1991–1996) and as an associate professor at the University of California, Berkeley (1996–2002) before joining the faculty of Harvard University in 2002, where she was Clarence Dillon Professor of International Affairs and Director of the Weatherhead Center for International Affairs. 

In 2016, she became Andrea Mitchell University Professor in Law and Political Science at the University of Pennsylvania Law School.

Simmons served as President of the International Studies Association from 2011–2012.  She was succeeded as President by Etel Solingen of the University of California, Irvine.

Awards and honors

2009: Elected to the American Academy of Arts and Sciences
2010: Awarded the Stein Rokkan Prize for Comparative Social Science Research.
2011: Karl Deutsch Award
2012: Guggenheim Fellowship
2013:  Elected to the National Academy of Sciences
2017:  Elected to the American Philosophical Society

Books 
  Won the Woodrow Wilson Award from American Political Science Association for best book published in the United States on government, politics, or international affairs.

References

External links 
Simmons' Harvard faculty page
University of Pennsylvania Law School faculty page

1958 births
Living people
American women political scientists
American political scientists
Duke University faculty
Fellows of the American Academy of Arts and Sciences
Members of the United States National Academy of Sciences
Harvard University alumni
Harvard University faculty
Members of the American Philosophical Society
University of California, Berkeley faculty
University of Chicago alumni
University of Pennsylvania Law School faculty
University of Redlands alumni
Winners of the Stein Rokkan Prize for Comparative Social Science Research
International law scholars
American women academics
21st-century American women